Lake Pinatubo is the summit crater lake of Mount Pinatubo formed after its climactic eruption on June 15, 1991. The lake is located in Botolan, Zambales, near the boundaries of Pampanga and Tarlac provinces in the Philippines.

Geology
Mount Pinatubo's volcanic activity has followed a cycle: centuries of repose terminated by a caldera-forming eruption with large pyroclastic flows; a post-eruption aftermath of rain-triggered lahars in surrounding drainages and dome-building that fills the caldera; and then another long quiescent period. During and after the eruptions, lahars descending along volcano channels may block tributaries from watersheds beyond Pinatubo, creating natural lakes. Geophysical evidence shows that there were at least two ancient lakes in the Mapanuepe River valley in the southwestern part of the volcano.

Origin

The climactic 1991 eruption of Mount Pinatubo destroyed the volcano's original summit. In its place is a  diameter caldera, the center of which is offset  northward from the pre-eruption summit. It was created from the collapse of the volcano's summit on June 15, during the period of abundant large earthquakes in response to withdrawal of a large volume of magma from the reservoir beneath the volcano. By early September 1991, a shallow lake formed. The high precipitation rate of the area led to a rapid transition from a small and hot acid lake to a large lake with near-ambient temperature and pH.

Legend
The mountain range wherein the volcano is located is inhabited by the indigenous Aetas. An old Aeta legend tells of a lake that once existed in the site, most probably the latter of the two ancient crater lakes, and of a great explosion that destroyed it.

Lake drainage

Risk of flash floods in the communities found in the vicinity of the recently dormant volcano is imminent because of a danger of the caldera collapsing due to water pressure and a long-term increase in the water level of ~1 m/month. Experts had feared the weight of the water could have breached the crater walls and flooded the homes of up to 40,000 people in and around the small coastal town of Botolan, located 25 miles from the volcano.

In September 2001, residents of Botolan and nearby areas were sent to evacuation centers as a precaution from a possible deluge of mud and water. The Philippine government ordered a controlled draining of the lake and had authorities dig a 5m-wide channel from the edge of the volcano's crater, draining about a quarter of the lake's volume and diverting the excess lakewater into local rivers. Existing lahar canyons serve as water drainage paths to surrounding rivers and creeks, the largest of which is the Bucao River. In 2002, accumulated rainwater in the lake rose to dangerous levels during the rainy monsoon season, breached the artificial drainage canal, and triggered mild lahar flows in the area.

Tourism

The lake is described as "a wide jewel of blue and green" and is now a popular bush walking destination, mostly frequented by mountaineers and adventure-seekers. Until improvements were made, a trip to the summit involved either days of hiking or hours of 4-wheel vehicle travel followed by a 2-hour hard hike. Eventually, a trail called the Skyway was made that allows 4 wheel drive vehicles a shorter route to a drop off point to trek to the crater. The skyway shortened the route to a 1.4-hour ride and a 45-minute to an hour's trek.

See also
 List of lakes of the Philippines

Notes

Sources

References
 PHIVOLCS – Pinatubo Data Update (retrieved: March 5, 2009)
 Mount Pinatubo Trek (retrieved: March 10, 2009)
 BBC News Online (retrieved: March 26, 2009)
 Newhall, C.G. and Punongbayan, R.S., Fire and Mud: Eruptions and Lahars of Mount Pinatubo, Philippines, Philippine Institute of Volcanology and Seismology, Quezon City and University of Washington Press, Seattle and London, 1126 pages, 1996. (retrieved: March 10, 2009)
 BBC NEWS World: Asia-Pacific, Friday, September 7, 2001, 12:52 GMT 13:52 UK (retrieved: March 10, 2009)
 BBC NEWS World: Asia-Pacific, Friday, September 7, 2001, 21:25 GMT 22:25 UK (retrieved: March 12, 2009)

External links
 Geographic data related to Lake Pinatubo at OpenStreetMap

Pinatubo
Landforms of Pampanga
Landforms of Tarlac
Landforms of Zambales
Tourist attractions in Pampanga